Benjamin Crawford Pierce is the Henry Salvatori Professor of computer science at the University of Pennsylvania. Pierce joined Penn in 1998 from Indiana University and held research positions at the University of Cambridge and the University of Edinburgh. He received his Ph.D. from Carnegie Mellon University in 1991. His research includes work on programming languages, static type systems, distributed programming, mobile agents, process calculi, and differential privacy.

As part of his research, Pierce has led development on several open-source software projects, including the Unison file synchronization utility.

In 2012 Pierce became an ACM Fellow for "contributions to the theory and practice of programming languages and their type systems". In 2015 Pierce and co-authors received the award for the most influential Principles of Programming Languages paper, which was described as "instrumental in bringing the view-update problem to the attention of the programming languages community and demonstrating the broad relevance of the problem beyond databases.  [...] More broadly, the paper sparked a great deal of follow-on work in the area of BX (“bidirectional transformations”), leading to a fruitful collaboration between the worlds of databases, programming languages, and software engineering."

Books
He is the author of one book on type systems, Types and Programming Languages .  He has also edited a collection of articles to create a second volume Advanced Topics in Types and Programming Languages . Based on the notes he collected while learning category theory during his PhD, he also published an introductory book on this topic—Basic Category Theory for Computer Scientists, . He is one of the authors of the freely available book Software Foundations.

See also 
 POPLmark challenge

References

External links
 Prof. Pierce's Homepage
 
 

American computer scientists
Living people
Programming language researchers
Year of birth missing (living people)
University of Pennsylvania faculty